Thomas Pascal Jones (1774–March 11, 1848) was a British-born engineer and publisher in the United States of America.

Biography
Born in Herefordshire in Britain in 1774, Jones emigrated to America as a youth.

In 1825 he became a cofounder as well as publisher and editor of American Mechanics Magazine.

Jones first lived in Washington, D.C., and served as superintendent and examiner of the United States Patent and Trademark Office. Later, he lived in New York City and taught at the Franklin Institute, in Philadelphia.

In 1828 Jones merged American Mechanics Magazine with the institute's existing magazine, entitling it Journal of the Franklin Institute. He remained its editor until his death in 1848. He was elected a member of the American Philosophical Society in 1831 and a Fellow of the American Academy of Arts and Sciences in 1834.

Selected works
 New conversations on chemistry

References

External links
 
 

1774 births
1848 deaths
Fellows of the American Academy of Arts and Sciences
People from Herefordshire
Patent examiners
English engineers
English publishers (people)